Přicházejí z tmy is a 1953 Czechoslovak film. The film starred Josef Kemr.

References

External links
 

1953 films
1950s Czech-language films
Czech drama films
Czechoslovak black-and-white films
1950s Czech films
Czech black-and-white films
Czechoslovak drama films